Thomas or Tom Stephenson may refer to:

 Thomas Stephenson (chemist) (1864-1933), Scottish chemist
 Tom Stephenson (activist) (1893–1987), British journalist and walkers' rights activist 
 Thomas Alan Stephenson (1898–1961), British marine biologist
 Thomas Bowman Stephenson (1839–1912), British Methodist minister 
 Thomas Frederick Stephenson (1894–1917), World War I flying ace with the Royal Air Force
 Thomas F. Stephenson (born 1942), American businessman and ambassador to Portugal
 Tom Stephenson (rugby union) (born 1994), English rugby union player
 Tom Stephenson (trade unionist) (1895–1962), English trade unionist

See also 
Thomas Stevenson (disambiguation)